Óscar Téllez Gómez (born 2 April 1975) is a Spanish former professional footballer who played as a central defender.

He was mostly known for his Alavés spell, and he amassed La Liga totals of 144 games and three goals over the course of six seasons.

Club career
After four years playing with modest clubs and one season in the second division with Deportivo Alavés (which he helped return to La Liga after a 42-year absence), Madrid-born Téllez joined Valencia CF for 1998–99 but, after just one appearance, finished the campaign with neighbours Villarreal CF also in the first division. Although he played all the games except two upon his arrival, he could not help the team's eventual relegation.

Subsequently, Téllez returned to Alavés which had in turn retained top-flight status, contributing with 33 matches in 1999–2000 as the Basques overachieved for a final sixth place. On 5 March 2000, he scored his first goal in the competition, the game's only in an away win against Rayo Vallecano.

The following season, Téllez was instrumental in both the domestic and European fronts, forming a solid defensive partnership with Antonio Karmona as Alavés reached the 2001 UEFA Cup final, lost to Liverpool in extra time. He continued to feature prominently for the side, helping them return to the top level in 2004–05 while collecting 27 yellow cards and being sent off three times in the process (both second division seasons added).

In early 2006, after quarreling with the management (amongst accusations he was grossly overweight, a condition which had bothered him on previous occasions), which featured the eccentric Dmitry Piterman, Téllez was fired, retiring from professional football shortly after.

International career
Téllez was capped four times by Spain, the first coming on 25 April 2001 in a friendly match against Japan, in Córdoba.

Honours
Alavés
Segunda División: 1997–98

Valencia
UEFA Intertoto Cup: 1998

References

External links
 
 
 
 

1975 births
Living people
Footballers from Madrid
Spanish footballers
Association football defenders
La Liga players
Segunda División players
Segunda División B players
Tercera División players
Pontevedra CF footballers
Deportivo Alavés players
Valencia CF players
Villarreal CF players
Spain international footballers
Spanish football managers